Rainer Zietsch (born 21 November 1964) is a German football coach and a former player who is the assistant coach of Germany U17.

Honours
VfB Stuttgart
 Bundesliga: 1983–84
 DFB-Pokal: runner-up 1985–86
 UEFA Cup: runner-up 1988–89

References

External links
 

1964 births
Living people
German footballers
Association football defenders
Germany under-21 international footballers
Germany B international footballers
Bundesliga players
VfB Stuttgart players
VfB Stuttgart II players
1. FC Nürnberg players
KFC Uerdingen 05 players
SpVgg Greuther Fürth players
SV Sandhausen players
German football managers
Association football coaches
West German footballers
People from Rhein-Neckar-Kreis
Sportspeople from Karlsruhe (region)
Footballers from Baden-Württemberg